The rock dove, Columbia livia, has a number of special adaptations for regulating water uptake and loss.

Challenges
C. livia pigeons drink directly by water source or indirectly from the food they ingest. They drink water through a process called double-suction mechanism. The daily diet of the pigeon places many physiological challenges that it must overcome through osmoregulation. Protein intake, for example, causes an excess of toxins of amine groups when it is broken down for energy. To regulate this excess and secrete these unwanted toxins,  C. livia must remove the amine groups as uric acid. Nitrogen excretion through uric acid can be considered an advantage because it does not require a lot of water, but producing it takes more energy because of its complex molecular composition.

Pigeons adjust their drinking rates and food intake in parallel, and when adequate water is unavailable for excretion, food intake is limited to maintain water balance. As this species inhabits arid environments, research attributes this to their strong flying capabilities to reach the available water sources, not because of exceptional potential for water conservation. C. livia kidneys, like mammalian kidneys, are capable of producing urine hyperosmotic to the plasma using the processes of filtration, reabsorption, and secretion. The medullary cones function as countercurrent units that achieve the production of hyperosmotic urine. Hyperosmotic urine can be understood in light of the law of diffusion and osmolarity.

Organ of osmoregulation
Unlike a number of other bird species which have the salt gland as the primary osmoregulatory organ, C. livia does not use its salt gland. It uses the function of the kidneys to maintain homeostatic balance of ions such as sodium and potassium while preserving water quantity in the body. Filtration of the blood, reabsorption of ions and water, and secretion of uric acid are all components of the kidney's process. Columba livia has two kidneys that are coupled, each having three partially separate lobes; the posterior lobe is the largest in size. Like mammalian kidneys, the avian kidney contains a medullary region and a cortical region. Peripherally located around the cortical region, the collecting ducts gather into cone-like ducts, medullary cones, which converge into the ureters. There are two types of nephrons in the kidney: nephrons that are located in the cortex and do not contain the loop of Henle are called loopless nephrons, the other type is called looped or mammalian nephrons. Looped nephrons contain the loop of Henle that continue down into the medulla then enter the distal tubule drain towards the ureter. Mammals generally have a more-vascularised glomeruli than the nephrons in birds. The nephrons of avian species can not produce urine that is hyperosmotic to the blood, but the loop of Henle utilises countercurrent multiplication which allows it to become hyperosmotic in the collecting duct. This alternation of permeability between different sections of the ascending and descending loop allows for urine osmotic pressure to be elevated 2.5 times above the blood osmotic pressure.

Specialized cell-types involved in osmoregulation
The integumentary system functions in osmoregulation by acting as a barrier between the extracellular compartment and the environment to regulate water gain and loss, as well as solute flux. The permeability of the integument to water and solutes varies from animal to animal. The excretory system is responsible for regulating water and solute levels in the body fluids. Pigeons can produce hyperosmotic urine, but their renal system is different from other animals. They do not produce concentrated urine to reduce water loss, but produce a whitish part called urate. It is considered as solid crystals of uric acid and it is less toxic than urea. The wastes move from the blood of the peritubular capillaries, passes through the tubule cells and into the collecting ducts, and is transported as urate (uric acid) to the cloaca and from there to the large intestine, where uric acid particle and water and solutes in the urine can be reabsorbed and balanced. This allows them to save their body water instead of excreting large volume of dilute urea. Cells of the proximal tubule have numerous microvilli and mitochondria which provide surface area and energy to the proximal tubule cells.

The blood pH is regulated by the A and B types of cells located in distal tubule and collecting duct. The A-type cells are acid-secreting cells that have a proton ATPase in the apical membrane and a Cl-/HCO3-exchange system in the basolateral membrane, whereas the B-type cells are base-secreting cells, which secrete bicarbonate into the lumen of the tubule in exchange for chloride ions. The regulation of pH in blood determines whether bicarbonate is reabsorbed or secreted.

Transport mechanisms of osmoregulation
The filtrate contains many important substances. In the proximal tubules of the C. livia kidney, substances that are needed, such as vitamins and glucose, are reabsorbed into the blood. Their kidneys have a variety of ion channels involved in salt and water transport. Water is reabsorbed through aquaporins which are present in the lumen of the proximal tubule, basolateral membrane, and blood vessels near the proximal tubule. Water flows from the epithelial cells into the blood via osmosis. Since osmosis occurs, the osmolarity of the filtrate remains isotonic. Sodium/Potassium/ATPase transporter is located in the basolateral membrane of the epithelial cell, which is opposite of the lumen of the proximal tubule, and actively pumps sodium out of the cell into the blood.

Special adaptations

Eggshell gas exchange and water loss 

Gas exchange across eggshells results in water loss from the egg. However, the egg must retain enough water to hydrate the embryo. As a result, changing temperatures and humidity can affect the eggshell's architecture. Behavioral adaptations in Columba livia and other birds, such as the incubation of their eggs, can help with the effects of these changing environments. It was found that eggshell architecture undergoes selection decoupled from behavioural effects, and that humidity may be a driving selective pressure.
Low humidity requires enough water to keep the embryo from desiccation, and high humidity needs enough water loss to facilitate the initiation of pulmonary respiration. The water loss from the eggshell is directly linked to the growth rate of the species. The ability of the embryo to tolerate extreme water loss is due to the parental behaviour in species colonising in different environments. Studies show that wild habitats of C. livia and other birds have a higher rate tolerance of various humidity levels, but C. livia  prefers areas where the humidity closely matches its native breeding conditions.
The pore areas of the shells allow water to diffuse in and out of the shell, preventing the possible harming of the embryo due to the high rates of water retention. If an eggshell is thinner, it can cause a decrease in pore length, and an increase in conductance and pore area. A thinner eggshell can also cause a decrease in mechanical restriction of the embryo.

References

Bird anatomy
Membrane biology